791 Ani (prov. designation:  or ) is a very large asteroid of the Meliboea family, located in the outer regions of the asteroid belt. It was discovered on 29 June 1914, by Russian astronomer Grigory Neujmin at the Simeiz Observatory on the Crimean peninsula. It was named after the historic Armenian city of Ani.

Orbit and classification 

When applying the hierarchical clustering method (HCM) to its proper orbital elements, Ani is a member of the Meliboea family, a small family of carbonaceous asteroids in the outer main belt, named after its principal body, 137 Meliboea. However, according to another HCM-analysis by Milani and Knežević (AstDyS), it is a background asteroid as this analysis does not recognize the Meliboea family. Ani orbits the Sun in the outer asteroid belt at a distance of 2.5–3.7 AU once every 5 years and 6 months (2,015 days; semi-major axis of 3.12 AU). Its orbit has an eccentricity of 0.19 and an inclination of 16° with respect to the ecliptic. The body's observation arc begins at Algiers Observatory in North Africa on 6 December 1915, some 17 months after its official discovery observation at Simeiz Observatory.

Naming 

This minor planet was named after the medieval city of Ani, which was destroyed by an earthquake in 1319. The ruins of the former capital of the Armenian kingdom are located near the border to Armenia, in what is now Turkey. Ani was known as "the city of 1001 churches". The  was also mentioned in The Names of the Minor Planets by Paul Herget in 1955.

Physical characteristics 

In the Tholen classification, Ani is a common, carbonaceous C-type asteroid. It is also a common C-type in the Tholen-like taxonomy of the Small Solar System Objects Spectroscopic Survey (S3OS2), while in the survey's SMASS-like taxonomic variant, the asteroid is a hydrated carbonaceous subtype (Ch).

Rotation period and poles 

In May 2018, a rotational lightcurve of Ani was obtained from photometric observations by American amateur astronomer Tom Polakis at the Command Module Observatory  in Arizona . Lightcurve analysis gave a well-defined rotation period of  hours with a brightness variation of  magnitude.

In June 2002, Brian Warner at his Palmer Divide Observatory first observed this asteroid and later derived a period of  hours and an amplitude of  magnitude, based on poor data. The two periods are slightly longer than twice Polakis period solution. In April 2007, astronomers at the Oakley Observatory , Indiana, obtained a period of  hours and an amplitude of  magnitude. In February 2011, French amateur astronomer René Roy determined a period of  hours and a brightness variation of  magnitude.
 
A modeled lightcurve by Josef Ďurech and Josef Hanuš, using photometric data including from the Lowell Photometric Database and from the Wide-field Infrared Survey Explorer (WISE) was published in 2018.

Diameter and albedo 

The Collaborative Asteroid Lightcurve Link adopts the results obtained by IRAS, that is, an albedo of 0.0329 and a diameter of 103.52 kilometers based on an absolute magnitude of 9.25. These timed observations are taken when the asteroid passes in front of a distant star.

Notes

References

External links 
 Lightcurve Database Query (LCDB), at www.minorplanet.info
 Dictionary of Minor Planet Names, Google books
 Asteroids and comets rotation curves, CdR – Geneva Observatory, Raoul Behrend
 Discovery Circumstances: Numbered Minor Planets (1)-(5000) – Minor Planet Center
 
 

000791
Discoveries by Grigory Neujmin
Named minor planets
000791
19140629